The 2006 Ohio Valley Conference men's basketball tournament was the postseason men's basketball tournament of the Ohio Valley Conference during the 2005–06 NCAA Division I men's basketball season. It was held February 28 – March 3, 2006. The first round was hosted by the higher seeded team in each game. The semifinals and finals took place at Gaylord Entertainment Center in Nashville, Tennessee. Top seed Murray State won the tournament, defeating Samford in the championship game, and received the Ohio Valley's automatic bid to the NCAA tournament. Murray State drew a 14 seed in the Washington, D.C. Regional, facing the 3 seed University of North Carolina.

Format
The top eight eligible men's basketball teams in the Ohio Valley Conference receive a berth in the conference tournament.  After the 20 game conference season, teams were seeded by conference record.

Bracket

References

Tournament
Ohio Valley Conference men's basketball tournament
Basketball competitions in Nashville, Tennessee
College sports tournaments in Tennessee
Ohio Valley Conference men's basketball tournament
Ohio Valley Conference men's basketball tournament
Ohio Valley Conference men's basketball tournament